Astrakhan is a city in Russia.

Astrakhan may also refer to:

Places
Astrakhan Oblast, a federal subject of Russia
Astrakhan Urban Okrug, a municipal formation which the city of oblast significance of Astrakhan in Astrakhan Oblast, Russia is incorporated as
Astrakhan Khanate, a Tatar feudal state in the 15th-16th centuries
Astrakhan Governorate (1717–1929), an administrative division of the Russian Empire and the early Russian SFSR
Astrakhan District, a district of Akmola Province in northern Kazakhstan
Astrakhan, Kirov Oblast, a rural locality (a village) in Uninsky District of Kirov Oblast, Russia

Other

Warship 
Astrakhan, a Buyan-class corvette of the Russian Navy

Fur items 
Astrakhan, another name of newborn karakul sheep's pelts, and hats and coats made from these pelts
"The Astrakhan", a style of fur cap historically and currently worn by elements of the Canadian Forces and some Canadian Police

Surname 
Astrakhan or Astrachan, a Jewish surname derived from the city name:
 Dmitry Astrakhan, Russian movie director and producer
 Joshua Astrachan, American movie script writer
 Owen Astrachan, an American computer scientist
 Mrs. Astrakhan, a character from the 2006 animated film Happy Feet
 Alan "Red" Astrachan, a character from the 1973 film Magnum Force

See also
Astrakhanka (disambiguation)
Astrakhanovka (disambiguation)